Out of the Dark (Into the Light) is the eighth album by Austrian singer Falco, released in 1998. It was released less than a month after Falco's death on 6 February 1998.

Background information
In 1995, the techno-styled song "Mutter, der Mann mit dem Koks ist da" ("Mother, the man with the coke (cocaine/charcoal) is here") by T>>MA ("T>>MA" as Falco's pseudonym) hit the market and brought the artist back into the charts of all German-speaking countries. In the song Falco plays with the ambiguity of the German word "Koks" which means both cocaine and charcoal.
Although Falco's band leader found "Out of the Dark" good enough to be released as the second single, Falco himself wanted it to be released on the album only.
The follow up single became "Naked" which was quite successful in Austria but did not meet Falco's expectations in Germany, leading him to postpone the album release.
It is known that Falco was unsure about the perfect order of the CD tracks, so that he often changed it, and he also planned to record a track called "Tomorrow Never Knows" as a cover from the Beatles (this is shown on the facsimile attached to the CD).
In the time shortly before his death, Falco also removed some songs that were eventually released on further albums, 'Best Of's and single CDs.

On 6 February 1998, Falco made one of his last phone calls. He told his guitarist, Milan Polak, to come over to the Dominican Republic because he wanted to record some songs with his band, but this never took place as Falco died in the afternoon of that day.

Three weeks after Falco's death in a car accident, the album was officially released in Austria, Germany, Switzerland and the Netherlands. The worldwide release was on 2 March 1998. Its previous title had been "Egoisten" ("egoists").

The album turned out to be a big success in German-speaking countries, resulting in another No. 1 in Austria, No. 3 in Germany and No. 4 in Switzerland; it also reached No. 35 in Hungary.

The posthumous singles charted quite well in most countries in comparison to those from his previous three albums. The single "Out of the Dark" was especially successful, climbing to No. 2 of the Austrian and the German charts respectively and also had very good airplay. Furthermore, it came under the Top 5 of the Latvian airplay charts and even reached the Argentine Airplay Charts of Buenos Aires with #98. Most of the posthumous success is credited to the song "Out of the Dark".

"Out of the Dark" contains the line "...muss ich denn sterben, um zu leben?" ("...do I have to die in order to live?").
This made many people think Falco felt that he was going to die soon, though he had already performed the song live a year before his death.
The actual inspiration for this line remains unknown.

"Egoist" and also "The Spirit Never Dies (Jeanny Final)" became his last notable hits in Germany and Switzerland.

Ten years after Falco's death, the album re-entered the Austrian charts again.

Track listing
"No Time for Revolution" – 3:52
"Out of the Dark" – 3:37
"Shake" – 3:42
"Der Kommissar 2000" – 3:48
"Mutter, der Mann mit dem Koks ist da" – 3:39
"Hit Me" – 3:47
"Cyberlove" – 3:34
"Egoist" – 3:27
"Naked (Full Frontal Version)" / "Geld" (hidden track) – 11:29

2012 Remaster Bonus Disc: 

Egoist (Remix)3:37
Push! Push! (Jeo Radio Mix)3:46
Push! Push! (Dee Jay Sören Radio Mix)3:31
Push! Push! (Jeo Extended Mix)5:31
Push! Push! (Dee Jay Sören Extended Mix)5:00
Out Of The Dark (Into The Light) (Remix)3:25
Out Of The Dark (Into The Light) (Instrumental)3:38
Naked (Original Mix)3:49
Naked (Sweetbox Short Mix)3:08
Naked (Sweetbox Filter Mix)6:50
Naked (Sweetbox Club Mix)6:16
Naked (Beam's Devil Dance)6:56
Naked (D-Syndroma House Mix)5:28
Naked (D-Syndroma Night Mix)6:02
Naked (D-Syndroma Radio Mix)4:00

Singles
"Out of the Dark" and "Egoist" were released posthumously after Falco's death.

*Airplay Charts (create by SYConline SA company, its top 100 for Buenos Aires city only)

**Czech Dance Charts

Charts

Weekly charts

Year-end charts

References

1998 albums
Falco (musician) albums
Albums published posthumously
A&M Records albums
German-language albums